Pulaparru is a village in Krishna district, Andhra Pradesh, India. It is part of the Mandavalli Mandal. The village has a population of 1914 people, spread over 491 households. The main occupation of the villagers is fish farming.

References

Villages in Krishna district